Andrew Black (born 13 May 1963) is a British entrepreneur who, together with Edward Wray, a gambling entrepreneur, founded Betfair, the world's first and largest bet exchange. He is now a noted angel investor in technology businesses in the UK and further afield, and is a keen race horse owner and professional bridge player.

He has won many awards, most notably Ernst & Young emerging entrepreneur of the year in 2002 (shared with Wray).

Early life
Black was born on 13 May 1963, the son of a property developer and grandson of Tory MP for Wimbledon Sir Cyril Black, who campaigned, among other things, against gambling. He attended King's College School in Wimbledon where he excelled at maths (according to a moneyweek profile in 2009, not citable due to an entry in Wikipedia's blacklist) and then attended the University of Exeter but was asked to leave during his second year, saying later that he had spent most of his time at the bookies rather than attending lectures.

Career
Black took a succession of unskilled positions after dropping out of university but when his younger brother, Kevin, contracted a debilitating brain infection at the age of 19 Black gave up work to look after him until his death aged 21. Black then worked in the City of London for a derivatives business, but during this time was becoming increasingly successful as a gambler, eventually earning sufficient money in winnings to give up work and concentrate on gambling full-time for a while. After initial success, full-time gambling looked unlikely to provide sufficient financial support for Black, who was newly married, so he set up a software business. The business won an on-site contract at GCHQ which involved being 'locked out of the office' every day at 5.00 pm, giving him long evenings during which to refine his ideas for a bet exchange. He became friends with Wray through playing bridge together and showed him a prototype he had programmed which succeeded in securing Wray's interest and investment.

Betfair
Black and Wray launched Betfair in 2000, having secured £1m of investment from friends and family and Morry Peter, a veteran bookie. Requests for venture capital investment had been rejected by the funds they had approached.

Other bet exchanges launched at the same time, but worked on the basis of offering single bets which interested punters would then accept individually. Betfair operated on a model more similar to a financial exchange, allowing among other things, multiple small bets to fill a position offered by a gambler wishing to place a large stake on a wager. This approach, combined with the acquisition of rival Flutter in 2001, secured Betfair 90% of the bet exchange market in the UK within a few years of launch.

In 2010 Betfair was floated on the London Stock Exchange at a £13 share price which valued it at £1.4bn, making Black's 15% stake worth approximately £200m. Black is known to have retained much of his stake, benefiting from the share price's subsequent climb to £44 before Betfair was delisted when it was merged with Paddy Power in 2016.

Post-Betfair activities

On 3 August 2009 Black announced that he was going into partnership with Michael Owen with regard to Owen's Manor House Stables; Tom Dascombe has been hired as trainer and the stated ambition is to own and train Group 1 horses on the Flat. Black and Owen were the joint owners of the racehorse Brown Panther, who won the Goodwood Cup in 2013 and the Irish St. Leger in 2014, winning the latter by six lengths.

Investments
Black's known investments include a significant stake in Hydrodec Plc where he has acted as a non-executive director and whose UK operations he acquired in 2016; ownership of Morelands Riverdale, a science park being built at Hampton, Surrey; a 30% stake in golfbidder.com, a sizeable stake in Touchlight Genetics, and a portfolio of early stage life sciences, gambling, sports and ecommerce business.

Blog 
Black has his own horseracing blog "Bert's Blog" where he discusses his bloodstock operations. The blog also features interviews with former Betfair staff such as Tony Clare, Steve High and Martin Cruddace.

References

1963 births
Living people
Angel investors
People educated at King's College School, London
English businesspeople
British technology company founders
Gambling in the United Kingdom